Forget-me-not refers to any member of the flowering plant genus Myosotis, particularly:
Flowers in the genus Myosotis
 Myosotis sylvatica or wood forget-me-not
 Cynoglossum amabile or Chinese forget-me-not

Forget me not may also refer to:

Film 
 Forget Me Not (1917 film), silent film drama starring Kitty Gordon
 Forget Me Not (1922 film), an American silent film melodrama
 Forget Me Not (1935 film), a German film
 Forget Me Not (1936 film), a British film
 Forget Me Not (2009 film), an American horror film
 Forget Me Not (2010 British film), a British romance film
 Forget Me Not (2010 Japanese film), a Japanese film
 Forget Me Not, a short film by Federico Castelluccio

Television 
 Forget Me Not (TV series), a Malaysian television series

Episodes
 "Forget Me...Not" (Charmed)
 "Forget-Me-Not" (Family Guy)
 "Forget Me Not" (Once Upon a Time in Wonderland)
 "Forget Me Not" (Psych)
 "Forget Me Not", fourth episode of Star Trek: Discovery (season 3)

Music

Albums 
 Forget Me Not (Dark Lunacy album), a 2003 album by Dark Lunacy
 Forget Me Not (EP), the unreleased debut album British singer-songwriter Lucie Silvas

Songs 
 "Forget Me Not" (Vera Lynn song), 1952
 "Forget Me Not" (Martha and the Vandellas song), 1968
 "Forget Me Not" (Bonnie Pink song), 1998
 "Forget Me Not" (Lucie Silvas song), 2005
 "Forget Me Not", song by the band Bad English
 "Forget Me Not", song by Roy Harper, 1975 
 "Forget Me Not", a 2003 song by Celine Dion from One Heart
 "Forget Me Nots", a song by Patrice Rushen, 1982
 "forget-me-not", a song by Reona from Sword Art Online: Alicization
 "Forget Me Not", a song by Enhypen from Border : Hakanai

Other
 Forget-Me-Not (annual), an annual or yearbook published in 1822
 Forget-Me-Not (video game), a 2011 game
 Forget-Me-Not (wooden canal boat), moored at Ashton-under-Lyne
 Forget-me-not stitch in Crochet
 Catochrysops strabo, a butterfly of Asia
 Forget-Me-Not (mechanical computer) built by Rowland Emett